Dicraeosaurus (Gr. ,  "bifurcated, double-headed" + Gr. ,  "lizard") is a genus of diplodocoid sauropod dinosaur that lived in what is now Lindi Region, Tanzania during the late Jurassic period. The genus was named for the neural spines on the back of its neck. The first fossil was described by paleontologist Werner Janensch in 1914.

Description

Unlike most diplodocoids, Dicraeosaurus had a comparatively large head with a relatively short and wide neck. Dicraeosaurus also lacked the "whiplash" tail tip typical of diplodocoids. The genus is notable for the rather tall neural spines protruding from its vertebrae, which it is named for. They were not straight as in some members of the family, instead forming a rough "Y" shape. These spines likely provided muscle attachment points.

Palaeoecology
 
Dicraeosaurus was a mid-sized herbivore for its ecosystem, found in the Tendaguru Formation of Tanzania, which dates to the Late Jurassic. The rocks also yield fossils of Giraffatitan and Kentrosaurus. As there was a distinct difference in size between these dinosaurs, they would probably have browsed on vegetation at different levels and therefore competition between them was likely rare.

References

External links
 Quick facts

Dicraeosaurids
Late Jurassic dinosaurs of Africa
Fossil taxa described in 1914
Taxa named by Werner Janensch
Tendaguru fauna